The Diocese of Pomerania-Greater Poland is one of the six dioceses constituting the Evangelical Church of the Augsburg Confession in Poland. The cathedral of the diocese is the Church of the Redeemer, Sopot.

Location 
The Diocese of Pomerania-Greater Poland is located in western Poland. Its territory includes Greater Poland Voivodeship, Pomeranian Voivodship, Kujawy, and the eastern part of West Pomeranian Voivodship.

List of Bishops 
Gustaw Manitius : 1937~1940
Vacant (1940~1946)
Ryszard Trenkler : 1946~1959
Edward Dietz : 1960~1983
Tadeusz Raszyk : 1983~1992
Michał Warczyński : 1992~2011
Marcin Hintz : 2011~

External links 
Official Homepage of The Diocese of Pomerania-Greater Poland (pol.)

Evangelical Church of the Augsburg Confession in Poland
Lutheran dioceses in Poland